Deshabandu is the third highest national honour awarded in Sri Lanka. It is awarded "for meritorious service". The title is held by no more than 150 living holders at any time. It is conferred with a citation and a silver medal with a symbol of a peacock. It is conventionally used as a title or prefix to the awardee's name. 

Deshabandu ranks lower than Deshamanya.

Awardees
Awardees include:

1986
 Ahangamage Tudor Ariyaratne 
 Hewa Komanage Dharmadasa
 Norendradas Jayaratnam Wallooppillai
 Daphne Attygalle
 Wimala de Silva
 Arulanandam Yesuadian Samuel Gnanam
 David Edwin Hettiarachchi
 Dhamital Senakumar Jayasundera
 Clara Motwani

1987
 Bulathsinhelage Sirisena Cooray
 James Ernest Ivan Corea
 Albert Edirisinghe
 Don Jinadasa Attygalle
 Siva Chinnatamby
 Lena Charlotte Fernando
 Mohamed Thassim Ahamed Furkhan
 Sathischandra Jayasinghe
 Abeysiri Mendis Munasinghe
 Abdul Haleem Sheriffdeen
 Franciskuhettige Gerald Hudson Silva
 Samuel Jeyarajah Stephen
 Victor Garwin Weerawardhana Ratnayake
 Michael Tissera
 Wickremasinghe Wimaladasa

1988
 Velu Annamalai
 Mohamed Mohideen Mohamed Abdul Cader
 Nuwarapaksa Hewayalage Keerthiratne
 Sembukuttiarachchige Bertram Silva
 Manicam Sivanathan
 John William Subasinghe
 Noel Wimalasena
 Swarna Ferdinand
 Alec Robertson
 Mirisse Hewage Gunadasa Siriwardena
 Julian Bolling
 Kosgamage Thilaka Dhammika Jinadasa

1989
 Palita Edward Dias Wijesiri Jayavardhana Karunaratna Weeraman
 Bogoda Appuhamilage Premaratne
 Callistus Reginald Seimon
 Sita Seneviratne
 Don Piyadasa Jayasinghe
 Gardi Punchi Hewage Karunaratne
 Jezima Ismail
 Joyce Selina Abeywardana Goonasekera
 Edith Marguerite Grace Fernando

1990
 Bomullage Dilipkumar Dharmasena
 John Arthur Ameratunge
 Carl Sepala Illangakoon
 Bertram Russell Heyn
 Victor Hettigoda
 Sangarapully Sellamuttu
 Surath Wickramasinghe
 Ayisha Rauf
 Eric Suriyasena
 Mohamed Sadique Gaffoor
 Surendra Ramachandran
 Albert Athisayaratnam Page
 Kaluthanthirige Nandasena Perera

1991
 Nihal Wilfred Karunaratne
 Abdul Raheman Mohamed Hathy
 Ajith Mahendra de Silva Jayaratne
 Jivaka Lalith Bhupendra Kotalawala
 Lankalalama Arunasiri Adithiya

1992
 Theva Anugriham Buell
 Deepika Chanmugam
 Kanitha Kumar Lal Devapura
 Kombala Vithanage Damayanthi Darsha
 Sriyantha Subashan Abeysekara Dissanayake
 Balapuwaduge Rohan Duleep Mendis
 Amugoda Arachchige Dayananda Gunawardena
 Karunaratne Jayasuriya
 Chevalier Andrew Kariyawasam
 Kuruppu Arachchilage Karunaratne
 Sinhalage Buddhi Keerthisena
 Mohotti Arachchilage Sriyani Kulawansa
 Muthumuni Roy Quintus de Silva
 Ethel Violet Rajapakse
 George Wilfred Rajapakse
 Ranasinghe Arachchige Saranapala Perera Ranasinghe
 Joseph Francis Antony Soza
 Peremartne Weerakoon
 Lihini Imala Weerasooriya

1993
 Bernard Alfred Botejue
 Reginald Sebastian Rodrigo Candappa
 Arjun Rishya Fernando
 Sirisumana Godage
 Nahammal Kasipillai
 Mas Dharma Kitchilan
 Pathirannahelage Nimal Pathirana
 Veeyanna Theyna Vaana Deivanayagam Pillai
 Arjuna Ranatunga

1994
 Abdul Wahab Mohamed Ameer
 Mohamed Rushdi Uvais
 George Lawrence Andrew Ondaatjie
 Sohli Edelji Captain
 Wilbert Kaggodaarachchi
 Tikiri Banda Madugalla
 Aelian Alwis Cohomban Wickrama Jayasekera
 Hevatantrige Patrick George Ernest Peiris
 Percival Upajiva Ratnatunga
 Weliwitigoda Ariyadasa Wimaladharma
 Don Piyadasa Wijenarayana
 Alfred Samaraweera

1996
 Aravinda de Silva
 Roshan Mahanama
 Hashan Tillakaratne
 Asanka Gurusinha
 Sanath Jayasuriya
 Pramodya Wickramasinghe
 Muttiah Muralitharan
 Romesh Kaluwitharana
 Chaminda Vaas
 Kumar Dharmasena
 Marvan Atapattu
 Ravindra Pushpakumara
 Upul Chandana

1998
 Primus Tillekeratne de Silva
 Ananda Daivin Soysa
 Rajadurai Sellaiah Thanabalasundaram
 Adhikari Mudiyanselage Dharmasena
 Nowfel S Jabir
 Rajapakse Pathirannehelage Jayaratne Pathirana
 Sunna Deniyage Gunadasa
 Seekkubaduge Wilbert Silva
 Mapatunage James Perera
 Minuwanpitiyage Darmasiri Dayananda Pieris
 Thambimuttu Duraisingam
 Muhammed Abdul Hameed Muhammed Hussain
 Merangne Gaulis Mendis
 Chasnyn Musafer
 BalaupasakageYasodis Thudawe
 Lady Puvaneshwari Vaithianathan
 Kolamba Patabendige Tissaweera Siriwardana Jinasena

2005
 A. E. T. Ellawala
 A. L. M. Abusali
 Arumadura Nandasena Silva Kulasinghe
 Christopher Gunapala Uragoda
 D. P. Wickremasinghe
 Diyanath Samarasinghe
 Harold Herath
 Indradasa Hettiarachchi
 Jinadasa Guruge
 Joe Abeywickrama
 K. P. Silva
 Kapila Gunawardena
 Kirthi Tennakoon
 Lakshman de Mel
 Lionel Fernando
 Lyn de Alwis
 Macky Hashim
 N Navaratnarajah
 Olcott Gunasekera
 Osmund Jayaratne
 Don Chandraprema Patrick Amarasinghe
 Ranjith Athapattu
 Reginald George Bernard Forbes
 S. D. R. Jayaratne
 Siran U. Deraniyagala
 Saddhamangala Karunaratne
 Senaka Dias Bandaranayake
 Stanley Kirinde
 Sivaramalingam Anandacoomaraswamy
 Suriya Wickremasinghe
 Swarana Jayaweera
 Tilak de Soysa
 Tissa Abeysekara
 Tony Ranasinghe
 Tuley de Silva
 Vajira Chithrasena
 Vivendra Lintotawela
 M. A. Careem

2017

 Deivanayagam Eassuwaren 
 Lakshman Lucian de Silva Weerasena
 Leslie Shelton Devendra
 Mahinkande Gamladdalage Kularatne 
 Susanthika Jayasinghe
 Ranjan Madugalle
 Shanthilal Nilkanth Wickremesinghe
 Thommadura Pabilis Silva
 Wegapitiya Kattadiyalage Hemachandra Wegapitiya
 Ahamed Rizvi Mohamed Rifkhan
 Sivanalagu Balakrishnan

2019 
M.R. Latiff
Edwin Ariyadasa
Sugath Thilakaratne
Professor Wimal Dissanayake 
Anura Punchi Bandara Tennakoon
Anslem Boniface Perera
Professor Raja Sarath Bandara
Professor Lakshman Dissanayake
Professor Shirajini Niriella
Professor Nimal Herath Sadaratne
Jerome L. de Silva
Augustin Roshan

References

External links

 
Civil awards and decorations of Sri Lanka